A list of notable Romanians of Armenian descent:

Arts
Theodor Aman, painter, engraver and art professor
Vartan Arachelian, journalist and writer
Anda Călugăreanu, actress
Corina Chiriac, singer, composer, lyricist, television director and actress
Lorand Gaspar, poet
Bedros Horasangian, writer, essayist, and journalist
Garabet Ibrăileanu, literary critic
Mihail Jora, composer and conductor
Leon Kalustian, journalist
Ioan Missir, novelist
Petru Th. Missir, literary critic
David Ohanesian, operatic baritone
Harry Tavitian, jazz musician
Krikor Zambaccian, art collector, founder of the Zambaccian Museum

Politics and Administration
Virgil Madgearu, politician, economist, and sociologist
Basile M. Missir, politician
Vasile Morţun, socialist activist
Grigore Trancu-Iaşi, economist and politician
Varujan Vosganian, economist and political figure
Varujan Pambuccian, mathematician, information technologist and political figure
Iacob Zadig, general

Religion
Vazgen I (1908–1994), Catholicos of Armenia from 1953 to 1994
Zareh Baronian, theologian

Sports
Florin Halagian, football manager

Others
Manuc Bei, innkeeper, founder of Hanul lui Manuc
Spiru Haret, sociologist, mathematician, physicist, and politician

References

 
Armenians
Lists of Armenian people
Armenian